Prionosoma may refer to:
 Prionosoma, a genus of true bugs in the family Pentatomidae
 Prionosoma, a genus of myriapods in the family Craspedosomatidae, synonym of Bergamosoma
 Prionosoma, a genus of flatworms in the family Echinostomatidae, synonym of?